Unakan Road is a road in the Rattanakosin Island or Bangkok's old town zone,  it is a road that has a beginning at Unakan intersection, where it meets Charoen Krung and Burapha roads, opposite The Old Siam Plaza in Wang Burapha area. Then, it runs straight north in parallel with Wat Suthat and Siriphong road before ends at the corner of the Giant Swing, with a total distance is 446 m (1,463 ft).

It was built by royal command of King Mongkut (Rama IV) in memory of Prince Unakan Ananta Norajaya, his son born to consort Piam Sucharitakul (later Princess Piyamavadi). The young prince died, at the age of 17 in the year 1873. After he died, his mother donated an amount of 8,000 baht to build public utility for the benefit of traveling to the people. Department of Sanitation (now's Department of Public Works) therefore completed the construction of this road in 1900 and received the officially name from the King Chulalongkorn (Rama V). In that era, it was considered a shortcut that bridges Charoen Krung and Bamrung Mueang roads.

In the past, the area around the road (including Siripong road) used to be a place to trade charcoal by rowing for sale in Khlong Lot, as well as also a very popular place of prostitution trade.

References

Streets in Bangkok
Phra Nakhon district
1900 establishments in Siam